Olga Pershankova (born 18 January 1972) is a Russian retired ice dancer. Competing with Peter Tchernyshev for Russia, she won the silver medal at the 1992 Karl Schäfer Memorial (Vienna Cup). The following season, she teamed up with Nikolai Morozov to compete for Azerbaijan. The two won the 1993 Golden Spin of Zagreb and competed at the 1994 World Championships and European Championships. 

Pershankova began figure skating at age five. After retiring from competition, she joined the Russian Ice Stars.

Results

With Morozov for Azerbaijan

With Tchernyshev for Russia

References 

1972 births
Russian female ice dancers
Azerbaijani female ice dancers
Living people
Figure skaters from Moscow